Air Asia or AirAsia may refer to:
AirAsia, a Malaysian low-cost airline
AirAsia China
AirAsia X
AirAsia India
Indonesia AirAsia
Indonesia AirAsia X
Philippines AirAsia
AirAsia Vietnam
AirAsia Zest
Thai AirAsia
Thai AirAsia X
AirAsia Japan
Air Asia (Taiwan), a Taiwanese aircraft service company

See also
Asiana Airlines, a South Korean full-service airline
Asia Airways, a Tajik airline
Indonesia AirAsia Flight 8501
Petaling Jaya Rangers F.C., a Malaysian football club, formerly known as AirAsia F.C.